William Osborne "Tuck" Tucker III (August 20, 1961 – December 22, 2020) was an American writer, storyboard artist, animator, songwriter, and director who worked on Hey Arnold! and SpongeBob SquarePants.

Early life and education
Tucker was born in Lynchburg, Virginia. He attended Virginia Episcopal School and Virginia Commonwealth University. He would spend most of his time at home watching cartoons with his father and cites these experiences as being very special to him. He married Connie Dyste in 1990 and had one daughter, Gina Tucker. The family resided in La Cañada Flintridge. Connie Tucker died of a rare cancer in 2015 and Tucker moved home to Virginia to teach art to students at Longwood University.

Career
While in animation class, his instructor moved him to Los Angeles after graduation for work at Disney to work on films like The Little Mermaid as his first animation job. Afterwards, he left to work on shows like The Simpsons from Fox, and then going to Nickelodeon while switching from storyboard work on Rugrats and Aaahh!!! Real Monsters to directing on Hey Arnold!. While after that, he moved on to SpongeBob SquarePants by his own choice and Hey Arnold! close to ending. He went from being a storyboard artist on The SpongeBob SquarePants Movie, to writing episodes of the show as a writer and storyboard director, and then to being a supervising storyboard director. During his time on SpongeBob, he won the 38th Annual Annie Award in 2011 for Best Music in a Television Production alongside Jeremy Wakefield, Sage Guyton, and Nick Carr. Afterward, he went to direct on The Fairly OddParents during its ninth season. In January 2015, Tucker began teaching graphic and animation design at Longwood University in Farmville, Virginia.

Death
Tucker died in Lynchburg on December 22, 2020, at age 59. His cause of death was not publicly disclosed.

Filmography

Film

Television

References

External links
 
 
 

1961 births
2020 deaths
American television writers
American male television writers
American storyboard artists
Animators from Virginia
Artists from Virginia
American television directors
American film directors
American animated film directors
Prop designers
Nickelodeon Animation Studio people
Walt Disney Animation Studios people
Writers from Lynchburg, Virginia
Songwriters from Virginia
Screenwriters from Virginia